São Joaquim is a metro station on Line 1 (Blue) and a future metro station on the planned Line 6 (Orange) of the São Paulo Metro located in the Liberdade district of São Paulo, Brazil.

References

São Paulo Metro stations
Railway stations opened in 1975
1975 establishments in Brazil
Railway stations located underground in Brazil
Railway stations scheduled to open in 2026